Isolotto Formica Lighthouse is an active lighthouse located 
The island is dominated by a quadrangular fortification, built by the Pallavicino in the mid 1600, and a Tonnara, built by the Florio in the mid 1800, which was closed in 1979. From the 1980s the island is a private property belonging to Mondo X which is involved in the recovery of drug addiction.

Description
The tower and the lantern are white, the lantern dome is grey metallic. The lighthouse is completely automated and managed by the Marina Militare with the identification code number 3128 E.F.

See also
 List of lighthouses in Italy
 Aegadian Islands

References

External links

 Servizio Fari Marina Militare

Lighthouses in Italy
Buildings and structures in the Province of Trapani
Lighthouses completed in 1858